Changyi District is a district of Jilin City, Jilin, China.

Administrative divisions
Subdistricts:
Hadawan Subdistrict, Xinghua Subdistrict, Yanjiang Subdistrict, Yan'an Subdistrict, Minzhu Subdistrict, Tongjiang Subdistrict, Wenmiao Subdistrict, Qiachunli Subdistrict, Weichang Subdistrict, Xindihao Subdistrict, Zhanqian Subdistrict, Lianhua Subdistrict, Xinjian Subdistrict, Dongjuzi Subdistrict, Shuangji Subdistrict, Jiuzhan Subdistrict

Towns:
Gudianzi, Huapichang, Zuojia

Townships:
Jiuzhan Township

References

External links

Jilin City
County-level divisions of Jilin